The Brooklyn Papyrus 35.1446 is the modern term for an ancient Egyptian document that is now in the Brooklyn Museum (New York).

Archaeological History 
It was bought by Charles Edwin Wilbour in Egypt between 1881 and 1896. The document probably comes from Thebes. After the death of Wilbour, the papyrus was given to the Brooklyn Museum by his widow in 1916, but remained in the home of Theodora Wilbour, a daughter of Charles Wilbour, until 1935. At that time, the papyrus consisted of approximately 600 small fragments, which were reassembled from 1950 to 1952. In 1955 the papyrus was published by William C. Hayes. It is one of the most important surviving administrative documents from Egypt in the Middle Kingdom.

Content 
The papyrus is inscribed on both sides and was used over a longer period. The document dates to 1809-1743 BCE.

Front side 
On the front is a list of 80 people in various columns who have apparently escaped from an institution called a Large Prison / Labor Camp (ḫnrt-wr) and are registering their discovery. The document lists their names, the father's name, as well as a high official, a place or an institution to which they originally belonged. There is a note in another column as to whether the person is male or female. There follows an administrative statement, a place where the case was ticked off with a note of where the refugees are currently. Finally, there are two notes as to whether the case is closed.

The content appears to date from the reign of Amenemhat III into the 13th Dynasty. Copies of a letter and royal decree to Vizier Ankhu are also included within the document.

The content of this list has been the subject of controversial research and there are basically two conflicting approaches. On the one hand, the document is seen as evidence of Egypt as a forced state, in which parts of the population were forced to work and these people considered the work so overwhelming that they fled from it. On the other hand, it was pointed out that the document covers a period of several decades and the number of refugees for such a period is not very large. The evidence of clan liability is remarkable. As long as the fugitives were not caught, relatives have been captured.

Back side 
On the back of the document is a list of servants and Asians sold by a woman named Senebtisi, apparently the widow of Resseneb. In particular, the many Asian names on this list aroused the interest of researchers and shows the high proportion of foreigners in Egypt in the 13th Dynasty.

References

Literature 
 William C. Hayes, A Papyrus of the Late Middle Kingdom in the Brooklyn Museum. Brooklyn Museum, New York 1955.
 Stephen Quirke, The administration of Egypt in the late Middle Kingdom: the hieratic documents. SIA Publications, New Malden (Surrey) 1990, pp. 127–154.

Collection of the Brooklyn Museum
Egyptian papyri
Middle Kingdom of Egypt